Imran Hashmi may refer to:

 Emraan Hashmi (born 1979), Indian film actor 
 Imran Hashmi (footballer) (born 1989), Pakistani footballer